Bondeshk (also Romanized as Bandoshk and Bundishk; also known as Bandeshg Sofla) is a village in Qaleh Zari Rural District, Jolgeh-e Mazhan District, Khusf County, South Khorasan Province, Iran. At the 2006 census, its existence was noted and also about ten families were living there.

References 

Populated places in Khusf County